This is a list of Australian plant species authored by George Don:

 Acacia brunioides A.Cunn. ex G.Don
 Acacia cultriformis A.Cunn. ex G.Don
 Acacia cyclops A.Cunn. ex G.Don
 Acacia deltoidea A.Cunn. ex G.Don
 Acacia fimbriata A.Cunn. ex G.Don
 Acacia holosericea A.Cunn. ex G.Don
 Acacia pendula A.Cunn. ex G.Don
 Acacia podalyriifolia A.Cunn. ex G.Don
 Acacia prominens A.Cunn. ex G.Don
 Acacia rigens A.Cunn. ex G.Don
 Acacia sertiformis A.Cunn. ex G.Don
 Alocasia macrorrhizos (L.) G.Don
 Aotus ericoides (Vent.) G.Don
 Brachychiton acerifolius (A.Cunn. ex G.Don) Macarthur & C.Moore
 Callistemon viminalis (Sol. ex Gaertn.) G.Don
 Catharanthus roseus (L.) G.Don
 Chrysophyllum roxburghii G.Don
 Clianthus formosus (G.Don) Ford & Vickery
 Crotalaria ochroleuca G.Don
 Daviesia leptophylla A.Cunn. ex G.Don
 Daviesia physodes A.Cunn. ex G.Don
 Decaspermum humile (G.Don) A.J.Scott
 Desmodium varians (Labill.) G.Don
 Dodonaea boroniifolia G.Don
 Dodonaea multijuga G.Don
 Elaeocarpus obovatus G.Don
 Hippobroma longiflora (L.) G.Don
 Hovea acutifolia A.Cunn. ex G.Don
 Hovea apiculata A.Cunn. ex G.Don
 Hoya linearis Wall. ex G.Don
 Isotoma scapigera (R.Br.) G.Don
 Lagunaria patersonia (Andrews) G.Don
 Ludwigia hyssopifolia (G.Don) Exell
 Melaleuca acerosa (Colla) G.Don
 Mirbelia rubiifolia (Andrews) G.Don
 Modiola caroliniana (L.) G.Don
 Oxylobium linariifolium (G.Don) Domin
 Rhodomyrtus psidioides (G.Don) Benth.
 Sagina maritima G.Don
 Scaevola sect. Xerocarpa G.Don
 Soliva stolonifera (Brot.) R.Br. ex G.Don
 Sphenotoma squarrosa (R.Br.) G.Don
 Swainsona formosa (G.Don) Joy Thomps.
 Villarsia exaltata (Sims) G.Don
 Viola caleyana G.Don

,

Authored, Don, George